This is a list of World Heritage Sites in Egypt with properties of cultural and natural heritage in Egypt as inscribed in UNESCO's World Heritage List or as on the country's tentative list. As of 2021, seven sites in Egypt are included. All of the sites are in the Cultural Criteria except for the Whale Valley which is listed in the Natural Criteria. In addition to its inscribed sites, Egypt also lists thirty-four properties on its tentative list.

World Heritage Sites

Tentative list
In addition to sites inscribed on the World Heritage List, member states can maintain a list of tentative sites that they may consider for nomination. Nominations for the World Heritage List are only accepted if the site was previously listed on the tentative list. As of 2016, Egypt lists thirty-three properties on its tentative list:

See also
Tourism in Egypt
List of World Heritage Sites in Africa
List of World Heritage Sites in the Arab states

References

 
Egypt
World Heritage Sites